Montage is an album released in 2006 by New Zealand operatic singer Yulia (Yulia MacLean).

Track listing
"We're All Alone"
"No-One Like You"
"Maybe"
"You Are Here"
"Everything You Touched"
"Habarnera"
"Che Faro"
"To Ni Veter"
"With You I'm Born Again"
"Pavane"
"Nobody Does It Better"
"Plaisir D'Amour"
"The Actress"
"The Show Must Go On"

Charts

Certifications

References

2006 albums
Yulia MacLean albums